Kaiwi Lyman-Mersereau (born May 13, 1983) is an actor from Honolulu, Hawaii. He is known for his co-starring roles in Den of Thieves, American Violence and Hickok.

Filmography

Films

References

External links
 

21st-century American male actors
Male actors from Honolulu
American male television actors
Living people
1983 births